Acoustica is a 2005 album by the American chamber orchestra Alarm Will Sound. The album consists of acoustic arrangements of electronic tracks originally composed by Richard D. James (also known as Aphex Twin), and originally appearing on his albums Selected Ambient Works Volume II, Richard D. James Album and Drukqs.

Track listing

References

2005 albums
Electronic albums by American artists